Don't Look at Me That Way (German original title: Schau mich nicht so an) is a 2015 German feature film directed by Uisenma Borchu, who also wrote the script and starred in the film. The film had its world premiere at the 33rd Filmfest München in the category "Neues Deutsches Kino" ("New German Cinema"). It is considered an overwhelming feature film that provocatively questions gender roles and is about an erotic power struggle between two young city women.

Plot
While looking for 5-year-old Sofia, the single mother Iva meets her neighbor Hedi. A sexual relationship quickly develops between the two. Instead of the longed-for love, however, a one-sided dependency arises, and Sofia and Hedi join forces.

After a long time, Iva's father returns and tries to rebuild the abandoned relationship with his daughter and granddaughter. He and Hedi get dangerously close and the situation escalates when they start an affair.

Dream scenes in which Hedi and Sofia visit Hedi's grandmother in Mongolia are recorded without comment.

Cast
Uisenma Borchu as Hedi
Catrina Stemmer as Iva
Josef Bierbichler as the grandfather
Anne-Marie Weisz as Sofia

Production

In the film, the director Uisenma Borchu plays a leading role alongside Catrina Stemmer, Josef Bierbichler and Anne-Marie Weisz. The film was rejected by various broadcasters and the film subsidy, and has a very low budget from the University of Television and Film Munich and the Society of Friends and Sponsors of the University of Television and Film in Munich e. V. of €25,000 was made as a diploma film.

Reception

Awards 

 Fipresci Film Critics Prize at the 33rd Filmfest München
 Special Mention at the International Tarragona Filmfestival REC 2015
 Bester Film (Best Film) at the Filmkunsttagen Sachsen-Anhalt 2015
 Bayerischer Filmpreis für Nachwuchsregie 2015
 Most Promising Talent Award 2016 at the Osaka Asian Filmfestival
 Grand Prix at the International New Talent Competition of the 18th Taipei Film Festivals

References

External links 

 Schau mich nicht so an on IMDb
 Schau mich nicht so an on filmportal.de

2015 films
German romantic drama films
2010s German-language films
Mongolian-language films
2010s German films
Lesbian-related films